Rechknanay   is a village in Southern Lebanon, located in Tyre District, Governorate of South Lebanon.

Origin of name
E. H. Palmer wrote that the name comes from a personal name.

History
In 1875, during the late Ottoman era,   Victor Guérin noted it as a small village of Metualis.

In 1881, the PEF's Survey of Western Palestine (SWP) described it: "A small village built of stone, containing about 100 Metawileh, on side of valley, surrounded by figs, olives, and arable land. Water is obtained from cisterns and the spring of 'Ain el Tozeh." They further noted: "The rocks to the west of the village are cut into wine-presses, cisterns, etc.; probably an ancient place."

References

Bibliography

External links
Recheknanay, Localiban
Survey of Western Palestine, Map 2:   IAA, Wikimedia commons

Populated places in Tyre District
Shia Muslim communities in Lebanon